Porto Novo is a concelho (municipality) of Cape Verde. Situated in the southern part of the island of Santo Antão, it covers 72% of the island area (564.3 km2), and is home to 41% of its population.  Its population at the 2010 census was 18,028. Its capital is the town Porto Novo. Its highest point, which is also the highest point of the entire island, is Tope de Coroa, elevation . The municipality of Porto Novo was created in 1962 when the parishes of São João Baptista and Santo André were separated from the older Municipality of Paul.

Subdivisions
The municipality consists of two freguesias (civil parishes):
Santo André
São João Baptista

Demography

Politics
Since 2016, the Movement for Democracy (MpD) is the ruling party of the municipality. The results of the latest elections, in 2016:

Twin towns – sister cities

Porto Novo is twinned with three municipalities in Portugal: Angra do Heroísmo, Estarreja and Tavira.

References

 
Municipalities of Cape Verde
Geography of Santo Antão, Cape Verde
1971 establishments in Cape Verde